The Lago di Tésero Cross Country Stadium (in italian: Stadio del fondo di Lago di Tesero) is a sport venue located in the village of Lago, in the municipality of Tésero (Fiemme Valley), in Trentino, northern Italy. It will host cross-country skiing and nordic combined for the 2026 Winter Olympics and Paralympics.

History

The project to create a cross-country ski center was born in the mid-1980s, when the Val di Fiemme was a candidate to host the FIS Nordic World Ski Championships. At the 1988 Istanbul convention the FIS International Committee decided to set the FIS Nordic World Ski Championships 1991 at Val di Fiemme.

The area of Lago di Tésero was chosen since it is located in the center of the Fiemme Valley, easily accessible (a new road in the bottom of the valley was realized on the occasion of the 1991 World Championship) and easily innevable in case of adverse weather conditions and lack of natural snow (the stadium is located near the left bank of the river Avisio, from which they can take the necessary water for the artificial snow).

After the success of both the 1991 and 2003, the stadium was renovated in 2010, in order to host again the FIS Nordic World Ski Championships 2013: they carried out many projects, including the construction of a new building that houses the commentary boxes and a 2000 m² warehouse, and extending the press room area. They also created a shooting range for the biathlon events at the 2013 Winter Universiade hosted here. The tracks have been enlarged (with a minimum of 9 meters), it was made a climb after the start, while runways and tunnels were created for the audience.

Features

The cross country stadium regularly hosts cross-country ski events. The ski center is open between December and mid March and, thanks to the lighting system, it is possible to ski also in the evening until 9 p.m. In case of snow lack, it's possible to ski at Lavazè Pass cross country center at the altitude of  MSL.

The venue hosted the cross-country ski events of three editions of FIS Nordic World Ski Championships (1991, 2003, and 2013), the 2013 Winter Universiade, and many events of the FIS Cross-Country World Cup. Every year hosts the Mickey Mouse Trophy of Cross-country ski (Trofeo Topolino di sci di fondo), and the Marcialonga passes through.

The buildings are all lined with Val di Fiemme wood and equipped with ISO 14001 environmental certification. The cost of stadium construction was funded at 95% by the Autonomous Province of Trento and the remaining 5% by the municipality of Tésero.

The cross-country stadium maximum capacity is about 50,000 spectators.

Tracks

The venue, located at the altitude of  mean sea level, opens in winter season. There are 19 km of tracks, mostly with guaranteed artificial snow, from December to February, and it is linked with the Marcialonga track.

The 3 km ring track is lit at night.

Inside the venue, there is a ski school, a ski rental, an ice rink, and a restaurant.

References

See also
"Giuseppe Dal Ben" Ski Jumping Stadium, Predazzo

Cross-country skiing competitions in Italy
Ski stadiums in Italy
Sports venues in Trentino-Alto Adige/Südtirol
Venues of the 2026 Winter Olympics